Prunus tetradenia is a species of Prunus native to the montane cloud forests of Mexico. It is a tree 6 to 20m tall. The resplendent quetzal consumes its fruit.

References

tetradenia
Endemic flora of Mexico
Trees of Mexico
Plants described in 1915